Austin Strand (born February 17, 1997) is a Canadian professional ice hockey defenceman for the Rochester Americans of the American Hockey League (AHL) as a prospect to the Buffalo Sabres of the National Hockey League (NHL). He previously played for the Los Angeles Kings and Anaheim Ducks in the NHL.

Early life
Strand was born on February 17, 1997, in Calgary to Leanne and Wade and grew up alongside his older brother Coleton and sister Krysten. Growing up, Strand played with Austin Wagner on the Calgary Bantam AA Blazers for their 2010–11 season before both were promoted to the Bantam AAA Northstar Sabres and Midget AAA Calgary Northstars.

Playing career

Major junior
Following his time with the Calgary Northstars, Strand was drafted in the third round, 48th overall, by the Red Deer Rebels of the Western Hockey League (WHL). He was subsequently re-assigned to the AAA team for one final season before making his WHL debut in 2014. Strand credited his off-season training, both physically and mentally, as the reason for him joining the lineup. Upon joining the team, Strand recorded his first career WHL goal in a 6–5 overtime loss to the Victoria Royals on October 14, 2014. His development impressed Rebels associate coach Jeff Truitt who said: "He’s really been a guy who has absorbed the information and just taken it to another level." Strand continued to produce offensively and tallied four goals and 13 points through 54 games by March 2015. As such, he began to gain attention from National Hockey League scouts leading up to the 2015 NHL Entry Draft and earned a 66th mid-term ranking by the NHL Central Scouting Bureau. His final ranking dropped to 101 and he went undrafted in his first year of eligibility.

Strand returned to the Rebels for the 2015–16 season where he tallied two goals and 11 assists for 13 points. As he remained undrafted, Strand was eligible for the 2016 NHL Entry Draft and was named to the NHL Central Scouting Bureau Player To Watch List. He maintained a shut-down role with the Rebels throughout the season and finished his campaign as a plus nine. Strand's offensive ability helped push the Rebels to the 2016 Memorial Cup where they faced the Brandon Wheat Kings.

Strand returned to the Rebels for the 2016–17 season where he began the season strong; surpassing his previous career-high point total through the first 12 games. He continued to produce for the Rebels and tallied 15 points with 12 penalty minutes through 38 regular-season games. In December 2016, Strand was traded to the Seattle Thunderbirds alongside a sixth-round pick in the 2019 Bantam Draft pick in exchange for defenceman Brandon Schuldhaus. Upon joining the Thunderbirds, Strand took up a leadership position and helped guide the team to the Ed Chynoweth Cup and the 2017 Memorial Cup. After being eliminated from the playoffs, Strand was invited to attend the Edmonton Oilers training camp but was released from his amateur tryout contract on September 14.

In his final major junior season, Strand signed a three-year, entry-level contract with the Los Angeles Kings on November 28, 2017. He finished the season with 25 goals and 39 assists for 64 points through 69 games and was subsequently assigned to the Kings' American Hockey League (AHL) affiliate, the Ontario Reign.

Professional
Strand immediately joined the Reign to complete the 2017–18 season but did not skate in any games. He returned to the Reign for the 2018–19 season but was loaned to the ECHL's Manchester Monarchs prior to the beginning of the season. He tallied two points in six games with the Monarchs before being recalled to the Reign on November 2. Strand subsequently made his AHL debut with on November 25 and tallied up an assist in a 7–6 overtime win over the Tucson Roadrunners. Strand alternated between the Reign and the Monarchs throughout the first half of his rookie season before he was able to become a mainstay on the Reigns' lineup in the second half.
 
Near the start of the 2020–21 season, Strand was re-signed by the Kings to a one-year contract. Once the NHL resumed play, Strand was named to the Kings' taxi squad as part of their opening night roster. Strand made his NHL debut on February 5, 2021, in the Kings' 5–2 loss to the Vegas Golden Knights. A few games later, he was fined $3,168.10 for spearing Arizona Coyotes forward Conor Garland during a game.

Following his fourth season within the Kings organization, Strand left as a free agent and was signed to a one-year, two-way contract with the Anaheim Ducks on July 14, 2022. Strand made 5 scoreless appearance with the Ducks over the opening months of the  season, playing mostly with affiliate, the San Diego Gulls. On March, 3, 2023, the Ducks traded Strand to the Buffalo Sabres in exchange for Chase Priskie.

Career statistics

References

External links
 

1997 births
Living people
Anaheim Ducks players
Los Angeles Kings players
Manchester Monarchs (ECHL) players
Ontario Reign (AHL) players
Red Deer Rebels players
Rochester Americans players
San Diego Gulls (AHL) players
Seattle Thunderbirds players
Ice hockey people from Calgary
Undrafted National Hockey League players